"Gifts" is the second single from Ray J's album All I Feel. The video was released on June 12, 2008.

Remix
A remix was released on July 1, 2008. The remix features Lil Wayne, Shorty Mack and Game.

Charts

References

2008 singles
Ray J songs
Song recordings produced by Detail (record producer)
2008 songs
Songs written by Ray J
Songs written by Detail (record producer)
Epic Records singles
MNRK Music Group singles